Peace Rules (bred and foaled in Florida at Newchance Farm on April 26, 2000), is a multiple Grade I-winning American Thoroughbred race horse. By Jules, a "black type" winner and classic sire in Brazil, Peace Rules' grandsire was Forty Niner, a son of the great sire- producing stallion, Mr. Prospector, a Leading sire in North America.  His dam, Hold To Fashion, has dropped five foals, all winners.

Early career

Initially trained as a juvenile by Gary Contessa, Peace Rules broke his maiden by four lengths on the turf.  He was then sold to Edmund A. Gann and transferred to Hall of Famer Robert Frankel. Peace Rules won five times in nine starts before he met Funny Cide in the 2003 Kentucky Derby.  Overshadowed in Frankel's barn by Empire Maker, Frankel's pick to win that year's Derby, Peace Rules had won the Grade II Louisiana Derby, beating Funny Cide (second after a late rally), before Empire Maker won a single stakes race.  He then won the Grade I Blue Grass Stakes gate to wire, beating Offlee Wild.

The 2003 Classics

Peace Rules was often ridden by jockey Edgar Prado, who won the 2006 Kentucky Derby on the ill-fated Barbaro. Coming into the Derby, Empire Maker was the "chalk" (horse racing term for favorite, taken from the days of a bookmakers chalking the odds on blackboards). Both of Frankel's Derby entries were beaten by the longshot Funny Cide, but Peace Rules led for over a mile and held on for third place and a check for $110,000.

In the Preakness Stakes, Peace Rules was the second choice on the morning-line at 8-5, behind only the Derby winner in a full field of twelve colts. He went to the lead as the field passed the stands for the first time. Scrimshaw pressed Peace Rules, forcing a quickened pace as Funny Cide and Cherokee's Boy sat a few lengths back going into the club-house turn. Coming out of the far turn, Midway Road skimmed up along the rail to challenge the leaders. Funny Cide then rallied to win by 9-3/4 lengths. Midway Road overtook Peace Rules, who held on to third by a neck over Scrimshaw.

Late career

In the summer months of his sophomore campaign, Peace Rules won the grade one Haskell Invitational Handicap, beating Sky Mesa and Funny Cide at Monmouth Park during the first week of August. Then he shipped north and placed second in the grade one Travers Stakes behind Ten Most Wanted at Saratoga Race Course on the last Saturday of August.

In 2004, at age four, Peace Rules won the Grade II New Orleans Handicap (beating Saint Liam and Funny Cide), the Grade II Oaklawn Handicap (again beating Saint Liam), and the Grade I Suburban Handicap by a neck in a three-horse duel with Funny Cide and Newfoundland. In 2004, Peace Rules was listed among the world's top 30 horses in the 2004 World Thoroughbred Racehorse Rankings.

Peace Rules at stud

Peace Rules retired in 2004 to stand at Vinery Stables in Summerfield, Florida.  His first winner was Trifecta King, a filly who took Hollywood Park Racetrack's Cinderella Stakes in 2008.

In October 2009, he was sold to the Korea Racing Authority to stand at the KRA'S Jeju Stud Farm.  As of August 2012, he had sired the stakes winners Cash Rules, Trifecta King, Peace Town, and Izzy Rules.

In 2011, Peace Rules was inducted into the Fair Grounds Racing Hall of Fame.

References

External links
 YouTube Peace Rule's Suburban

2000 racehorse births
Racehorses trained in the United States
Racehorses bred in Florida
Thoroughbred family 5-j